An Appropriation Act is an Act of the Parliament of the United Kingdom which, like a Consolidated Fund Act, allows the Treasury to issue funds out of the Consolidated Fund. Unlike a Consolidated Fund Act, an Appropriation Act also "appropriates" the funds, that is allocates the funds issued out of the Consolidated Fund to individual government departments and Crown bodies. Appropriation Acts were formerly passed by the Parliament of Great Britain.

Format
Each Appropriation Act has a series of schedules which contain tables that set out how the monies issued out of the Consolidated Fund are appropriated. Each department or body which has money appropriated is noted in the tables which contain columns setting out the things the money appropriated may be spent on, the net resources authorised for use, the grants out of the Consolidated Fund, the operating appropriations in aid and the non-operating appropriations in aid. The money may not be spent for purposes other than that it is appropriated for and it must be spent by the end of the fiscal year covered by that appropriation or returned to the Consolidated Fund.

The typical structure of such an Act begins with the long title, which defines which financial years the Act applies to. This is followed by the preamble, which is different from the normal British public general Act of Parliament preamble in that it includes additional text before the normal preamble:

Whereas the Commons of the United Kingdom in Parliament assembled have resolved to authorise the use of resources and the issue of sums out of the Consolidated Fund towards making good the supply which they have granted to Her Majesty in this Session of Parliament:—

Be it therefore enacted by the Queen's most Excellent Majesty, by and with the advice and consent of the Lords Spiritual and Temporal, and Commons, in this present Parliament assembled, and by the authority of the same, as follows:—

Until 2000 an older form of preamble was used:

Most Gracious Sovereign,
	
WE, Your Majesty's most dutiful and loyal subjects, the Commons of the United Kingdom in Parliament assembled, towards making good the supply which we have cheerfully granted to Your Majesty in this Session of Parliament, have resolved to grant unto Your Majesty the sums hereinafter mentioned; and do therefore most humbly beseech Your Majesty that it may be enacted and be it enacted by the Queen's most Excellent Majesty, by and with the advice and consent of the Lords Spiritual and Temporal, and Commons, in this present Parliament assembled, and by the authority of the same, as follows:—

Each Appropriation Act typically covers two or more fiscal years, and will normally repeal earlier Appropriation Acts and Consolidated Fund Acts still on the statute books.

Effect
An Appropriation Act normally becomes spent on the conclusion of the financial year to which it relates.

List

The Act 15 Geo 3 c 42 (1775)
The Act 39 Geo 3 c 114 (1799)
The Consolidated Fund (Appropriation) Act (1864) (27 & 28 Vict c 73). The Bill for this Act was the Consolidated Fund (Appropriation) Bill. This Act received royal assent on 29 July 1864.
The Appropriation Act 1870 (33 & 34 Vict c 96). This Act received royal assent on 10 August 1870. Section 7 was amended by section 6 of the Appropriation Act 1872, and repealed by section 6 of the Appropriation Act 1877. The Appropriation Act 1870, except sections 6 and 8, was repealed by the Statute Law Revision Act 1883. The words "militia, yeomanry" in section 6 were repealed by the Territorial Army and Militia Act 1921. The whole Act was repealed for the United Kingdom by the Schedule to the Statute Law Revision Act 1966, and for the Republic of Ireland by Part 4 of the Schedule to the Statute Law Revision Act 1983.
The Appropriation Act 1871 (34 & 35 Vict c 89). This Act received royal assent on 21 August 1871, and was repealed by the Statute Law Revision Act 1883.
The Appropriation Act 1872 (35 & 36 Vict c 87). This Act received royal assent on 10 August 1872. Section 6 was repealed by section 6 of the Appropriation Act 1877. The Appropriation Act 1872 was repealed by the Statute Law Revision Act 1883.
The Appropriation Act 1873 (36 & 37 Vict c 79). This Act received royal assent on 5 August 1873, and was repealed by the Statute Law Revision Act 1883.
The Appropriation Act 1874 (37 & 38 Vict c 56). This Act received royal assent on 7 August 1874, and was repealed by the Statute Law Revision Act 1883.
The Appropriation Act 1875 (38 & 39 Vict c 78). This Act received royal assent on 13 August 1875, and was repealed by the Statute Law Revision Act 1883.
The Appropriation Act 1876 (39 & 40 Vict c 60). This Act received royal assent on 15 August 1876, and was repealed by the Statute Law Revision Act 1883.
The Appropriation Act 1877 (40 & 41 Vict c 61). This Act received royal assent on 14 August 1877, and was repealed by the Statute Law Revision Act 1883.
The Appropriation Act 1878 (41 & 42 Vict c 65). This Act received royal assent on 16 August 1878, and was repealed by the Statute Law Revision Act 1883.
The Appropriation Act 1879 (42 & 43 Vict c 51). This Act received royal assent on 15 August 1879, and was repealed by the First Schedule to the Statute Law Revision Act 1894.
The Appropriation Act 1880 (43 Vict c 13). This Act received royal assent on 24 March 1880, and was repealed by the First Schedule to the Statute Law Revision Act 1894.
The Appropriation Act 1880 (Session 2) (43 & 44 Vict c 40). This Act received royal assent on 7 September 1880, and was repealed by the First Schedule to the Statute Law Revision Act 1894.
The Appropriation Act 1881 (44 & 45 Vict c 56). This Act received royal assent on 27 August 1881, and was repealed by the First Schedule to the Statute Law Revision Act 1894.
The Appropriation Act 1882 (45 & 46 Vict c 71). This Act received royal assent on 18 August 1882.
The Appropriation Act 1883 (46 & 47 Vict c 50). This Act received royal assent on 25 August 1883.

Northern Ireland
A number of Appropriation Acts were passed by the Parliament of Northern Ireland. A number of Appropriation Orders in Council have been made for Northern Ireland.

See also
List of short titles
Appropriations bill (United States)

References
Notes

Bibliography

Further reading
Norman Wilding and Philip Laundy. "Appropriation Act". An Encyclopaedia of Parliament. Third Edition. Frederick A Praeger. New York and Washington. 1968. Pages 24 and 25. See also pages 3, 129, 167, 168, 250, 253, 254, 536, 596, 599, 601 and 685.
Will Bateman. Public Finance and Parliamentary Constitutionalism. Cambridge University Press. 2020. Page 31 et seq.

External links

United Kingdom public law
Legal history of England
Repealed Great Britain Acts of Parliament
Great Britain Acts of Parliament 1800
Public finance of the United Kingdom